The Vlaamsche Hoogeschool (Dutch; "Flemish Academy"), commonly referred to by its detractors as von Bissing university, was a Dutch-speaking university established at Ghent in German-occupied Belgium in October 1916. The university, which was separate from the existing State University of Ghent, formed part of the German Flamenpolitik and was a response to the long-established grievance of the Flemish Movement which campaigned against Ghent University's curriculum being taught only in French, despite the university being located in Dutch-speaking Flanders. The institution took its informal name from Moritz von Bissing, the German Governor-General of Belgium from 1914 to 1917, who was one of the chief proponents of the Flamenpolitik.

Background
Before the outbreak of World War I higher education in Belgium was run in French, despite the presence of a majority Dutch-speaking population. French had historically been privileged as the language of the government, civil service and the bourgeois across the country. In the late 19th century, however, the emerging Flemish Movement (Vlaamse Beweging) increasingly challenged the use of French in majority Dutch-speaking Flanders. In the years before the World War I, the movement had achieved de jure legal equality for Dutch as an official national language, but the issue was still contentious at the outbreak of war in August 1914. In particular, the language used in higher education was still being highlighted by the Flemish Movement, as French remained the only language of instruction in all Belgian universities. At the outbreak of war, it appeared that the State University of Ghent, located in the Flemish city of Ghent, would be forced by law to begin teaching in Dutch by 1915, but the outbreak of war and German invasion of Belgium stopped any realization of this objective.

In German-occupied Belgium, Governor-General Moritz von Bissing sought to make the territory easier to govern by exploiting pre-war linguistic divisions. The Flamenpolitik ("Flemish policy") was launched in 1916 and was also influenced by Pan-German beliefs. In particular, since the issue of Ghent University was already contentious, the German administration hoped to legitimize itself and at the same time to discredit the Belgian state.

University

The university was inaugurated on 3 October 1916 with Peter Hoffmann as rector, with around 40 academics. The German mathematician, Walther von Dyck, was put in charge of the project. Von Dyck strongly believed that the university would defend Germany's strategic and military interests, describing it as "a mighty fortress, a trusty shield and a weapon for us Germans."

The university opened its doors on 24 October 1916. It faced opposition from current students at Ghent University, and also was condemned by a petition signed by 38 leading Flemish public figures including Louis Franck delivered before its opening. Among the academics was the lawyer , historian Jules Mees, and the activist . Among the original students was the Flemish Movement activist Wies Moens and the poet Gaston Burssens. It was considerably smaller than the State University of Ghent, which admitted more than 1,200 students each year before the war. By contrast, Von Bissing university never had more than 400 students in each year at its height.

Reception and legacy
The university itself is considered by historians to have failed to achieve its aims. It failed to gain wide support from across Flemish Movement, particularly since some of the early supporters, including the historian Paul Fredericq who had campaigned for Dutch language instruction, had been imprisoned. It was equally resented by many French-speaking academics. This, however, did not stop the continuation of the Flamenpolitik by the German administration, which led to the creation of the Council of Flanders (Raad van Vlaanderen, or RVV; a quasi-independent Flemish government) in February 1917.

Although the Flemish Movement had campaigned for the "Flemishization" (flamandisation) of Ghent University, many within the movement were divided about whether accepting the university would be collaboration and some students passively resisted it. The establishment of the university created a rupture within the Flemish Movement between the "Activists" (activisten) who supported the German initiatives and the "Passivists" (passivisten) who opposed any form of collaboration with the Germans. After the end of the war, in 1930, Ghent University became Dutch speaking following continued agitation by the Flemish Movement.

Von Bissing University featured in the Belgian 2014 miniseries  ("In Flanders' Fields") produced by VRT. In it, one of the protagonists, Philippe Boesman (played by Wim Opbrouck), tries and fails to get tenure at the university as an academic gynaecologist.

See also
University of Warsaw - a similar institution reopened by German occupation authorities in 1915 to seek support from Polish nationalists in the former Russian Empire

References

Citations

Bibliography

Further reading

External links

University of Ghent in 1914-1918 Online Encyclopedia.
Wetenschap aan de Von Bissinguniversiteit at BESTOR (Belgian Science and Technology Online Resources).

Flemish Movement
German occupation of Belgium during World War I
1916 establishments in Belgium
Defunct universities and colleges in Belgium
History of Flanders
20th century in Ghent
1918 disestablishments in Belgium
Ghent University